Taiz University was founded in Yemen, Taiz, on 19 April 1993, and opened on 11 October 1995. It consists of eight colleges and five science centres.

Colleges
 Faculty of Education
 Faculty of Science
 Faculty of Medicine
 Faculty of Arts
 Faculty of Administrative Sciences
 Faculty of Law
 Faculty of Engineering and Information Technology
 Faculty of Education, Arts and Sciences (in Al-Turba)
 Faculty of Computers & information technology (in Al-Turba)

Centres
 Languages Centre
 Training and Consultancy Centre
 Centre of Training and Educational Development
 Centre of Environmental Studies and Community Service
 Centre of Cultural activities and Media

References

External links 
 Official website

 
Universities in Yemen
Educational institutions established in 1996
1995 establishments in Yemen